Sagarika (pronounced: sɑːgərikɑː), (Sanskrit - Oceanic) also known by the code names K-15 or B-05, is an Indian submarine-launched ballistic missile (SLBM) with a range of  that was designed for retaliatory nuclear strikes. It belongs to the K Missile family and forms a part of India's nuclear triad.

Description 
The K-15 is a two-stage submarine-launched ballistic missile which uses a gas booster to eject out of its launch platform and rise up to the surface of water. A solid rocket motor is fired after the missile reaches a fixed altitude.

Development
Development of the K-15 missile started in the late 1990s with the goal of building a submarine-launched ballistic missile for use with the Indian Navy nuclear-powered s. It was developed at the Defence Research and Development Organisation’s (DRDO) missile complex in Hyderabad.

The development of the underwater missile launcher, known as Project 420, was completed in 2001 and handed over to the Indian Navy for trials. The missile launcher is developed at Hazira in Gujarat. The Sagarika missile began integration with India's nuclear-powered Arihant class submarine that began harbor trials on 26 July 2009.

By 2008, the missile was successfully test fired seven times, and tested to its full range up to four times. The tests of 26 February 2008, were conducted from a submerged pontoon  beneath the surface off the coast of Visakhapatnam. A land-based version of the K-15 Sagarika was successfully test-fired on  12  November 2008. A full range test of the missile was done on 11 March 2012. The twelfth and final development trial of the missiles was conducted on 27 January 2013. According to DRDO Director General V. K. Saraswat, the missile was again tested for its full range of 700 km and met all its objectives with a single digit impact-accuracy. On 25 November 2015, a dummy or unarmed K-15 Sagarika missile was successfully test fired from INS Arihant. The missile was tested for a total of three times on August 11 and August 12, 2018. This completed the first phase of user trials of the missile.

The missile was fully operationalised in August 2018.

Operators

See also

K Missile family

K-4 (SLBM)

Notes

References

External links
CSIS Missile Threat - Sagarika/Shaurya
Video of the 12th test of Sagarika, on 27 January 2013

Submarine-launched ballistic missiles
Defence Research and Development Organisation
Ballistic missiles of India
Nuclear weapons programme of India
2018 in India
Military equipment introduced in the 2010s